The Brookings University Residential Historic District is a  historic district in Brookings, South Dakota which was listed on the National Register of Historic Places in 1999.

The district included 303 contributing buildings.  It is roughly bounded by Harvey Dunn St., Medary Ave., Sixth St., and Main Ave. in Brookings.

It is roughly a four-block by four-and-a-half-block rectangle situated two blocks east of Brookings' Main Street. It includes some of the oldest buildings in the town.

References

Historic districts on the National Register of Historic Places in South Dakota
Victorian architecture in South Dakota
Late 19th and Early 20th Century American Movements architecture
Brookings County, South Dakota